R. Thomas Butler (born April 25, 1946) is an American Republican politician who served in the Oregon House of Representatives from 1999 until 2007.

Career
Butler was elected to the Oregon House in 1998, representing Ontario. He served until 2007, when he resigned to pursue a church mission. He was succeeded by fellow Republican Cliff Bentz, a lawyer from Ontario, who was unanimously elected by the district's commissioners. Bentz was elected to a full term in 2008.

Personal life
Butler's wife, Darlene, was diagnosed with West Nile virus in August 2007, however she recovered. The Butlers are members of the Church of Jesus Christ of Latter-day Saints. They have five children: Heidi, Joseph, Kenyon, John, and Melanie.

References

Living people
1946 births
Republican Party members of the Oregon House of Representatives
American Mormon missionaries in the United States
Latter Day Saints from Oregon
People from Ontario, Oregon
Brigham Young University alumni
21st-century American politicians